Irwin "Ernie" Roth (August 30, 1926 – October 12, 1983), known by the ring names The Grand Wizard of Wrestling and Abdullah Farouk, was an American professional wrestling manager. Not a wrestler himself due to his small stature, he was noted for his flamboyant outfit of sequined jackets, wraparound sunglasses, and a brightly colored turban decorated with jewels and feathers. He was inducted into the WWE's Hall of Fame class of 1995.

Professional wrestling career

Abdullah Farouk
Ernie Roth got his start in the entertainment business as a disc jockey. He was discovered by Jim Barnett who helped Roth get into the wrestling industry. He became involved in professional wrestling as a manager in the 1960s in Detroit-based territories. Roth first worked under the names "Mr. Clean" and "J. Wellington Radcliffe." He also portrayed "Abdullah Farouk", the heel (villainous) manager of The Sheik. He frequently appeared on the Toronto wrestling circuit, where local announcer Lord Athol Layton would usually refer to him as "The weasel, Abdullah Farouk".

Sporting a turban, Farouk took great pains in trying to control his madman protégé. But he also carved a niche for himself as a deceitful, underhanded character who insulted US fans whenever he had a chance. Farouk was a pioneer of "manager interference", as he physically would attempt to alter a match's outcome in the Sheik's favor. This sort of interference was rare at the time.

The Grand Wizard
Roth began a stint with the World Wide Wrestling Federation (WWWF) in the 1970s, where he became known as The Grand Wizard. Roth, who was Jewish, reportedly took the name "The Grand Wizard" as a snub to the white supremacy organization the Ku Klux Klan, whose leaders were called Grand Wizard.

Almost immediately after arrival in 1971, the Wizard managed Black Jack Mulligan and "Beautiful Bobby" Harmon. He later led Mr. Fuji and Prof. Toru Tanaka to two reigns with the WWWF World Tag Team Championship. A year later, the Wizard led Stan Stasiak to victory over Pedro Morales for the WWF Championship in Philadelphia on December 1, 1973. The Wizard guided a second protégé, Superstar Billy Graham, to the very same championship on April 30, 1977, when Graham overcame Bruno Sammartino in Baltimore. On February 20, 1978, Bob Backlund dethroned Graham at Madison Square Garden. The Wizard made it his duty to gain revenge on Backlund, sending charges such as Don Muraco, Ken Patera and Greg Valentine after him.

The Wizard managed the first Intercontinental Champion Pat Patterson, and later Patera (who defeated Patterson for the title in April 1980 after the Wizard and Patterson parted ways) and Muraco to the same championship. Other protégés of the Wizard included "Beautiful Bobby" Harmon, Killer Kowalski, "Crazy Luke" Graham, Sgt. Slaughter, "Big Cat" Ernie Ladd, Ox Baker, "Cowboy" Bob Orton and The Masked Superstar.

Other media
Roth on many occasions (when out of character and greasepaint mustache) co-hosted the syndicated Big Time Wrestling show with fellow announcer Bob Finnegan until 1969 when the hosting duties went to Lord Athol Layton.

Personal life and death
Roth was revealed posthumously to be homosexual, although some claim they were aware of his sexual orientation during his lifetime. He was the godfather of protégé Don Muraco's daughter. His parents were Evrum (Edward) Roth and Rizel (Rose) Stern. According to the autobiography of former WWE referee and wrestler Dangerous Danny Davis, Roth was also in charge of helping get the ring to all shows. The position was eventually taken over by Davis himself after Roth's death.

On October 12, 1983, Roth died of a heart attack at his Fort Lauderdale, Florida home at the age of 57. Later WWF manager The Wizard claimed to be in communion with Roth's spirit. In 1995, Roth was inducted into the WWE Hall of Fame class of 1995 by his friend and protégé Sgt. Slaughter.

Awards and accomplishments
Pro Wrestling Illustrated
Editors' Award (1983)
Manager of the Year (1973, 1977)
Ring Chronicle Professional Wrestling Hall of Fame
Inductee
World Wrestling Federation
WWF Hall of Fame (Class of 1995)

See also

 List of Jewish professional wrestlers

References

External links

 
 

1926 births
1983 deaths
20th-century American Jews
20th-century American LGBT people
American LGBT sportspeople
American people of German descent
Gay sportsmen
Jewish American sportspeople
Jewish professional wrestlers
LGBT people from Florida
LGBT professional wrestlers
People from Fort Lauderdale, Florida
Professional wrestling managers and valets
WWE Hall of Fame inductees